Night of the Living Dead: Darkest Dawn, also known as Night of the Living Dead: Origins and Night of the Living Dead: Origins 3D, is a 2015 computer-animated horror film directed by Krisztian Majdik and Zebediah De Soto and produced by Simon West. The film is a re-telling of the original Night of the Living Dead in a contemporary setting.

Premise
An animated re-telling of the original Night of the Living Dead film. Set in modern-day New York City rather than 1960s rural Pennsylvania. Centers on a group of desperate survivors fighting to stay alive barricaded in an abandoned apartment building. Confined, cut off from the world, and under constant attack from the undead hordes closing in around them, the six main characters struggle to survive while also confronting their own sense of compassion and humanity.

Cast
 Tony Todd as Ben
 Danielle Harris as Barbara Todd
 Bill Moseley as Johnny Todd
 R. Madhavan as Tom Bitner
 Joseph Pilato as Harry Cooper
 Sydney Tamiia Poitier as Tami
 Alona Tal as Helen Cooper
 Tom Sizemore as Chief McClellan
 Sarah Habel as Judy Rose Larson
 Jesse Corti as News Reporter
 Anastasia Roark as Susan Donaldson
 Cornell Womack as Hunter Deets
 Erin Braswell as Judy
 Mike Diskint as Tom
 Tech N9ne as Zombie

Production
The film had been in production on and off for five years since 2009. According to Tony Todd, the film had two different directors with two different approaches at different points in time. The film features visual effects from The Graphic Film Company, Los Angeles, which relied on the iPi Soft iPi Motion Capture markerless motion capture software. The software’s ability allows the filmmakers to produce very large amounts of moving zombies on screen and also allows the actors to motion capture their performances as if they were acting on a real film set.

Mos Def was originally cast as a voice actor, but after a short time, he was released from the project.  Both Todd and Moseley would be reprising their roles as Ben and Johnny, respectively, from the 1990 version of the film. Indian actor R. Madhavan was signed on to play a role in mid 2013.

Release and reception
The film was reported to be complete in May 2014. A theatrical release across the United States of America was planned in the fall of 2014. However this did not happen. The film later premiered at 2015 Comic Con held in San Diego as a part of the Walker Stalker Fan Fest, during July 2015. The film was later released in October 2015 on iTunes and OnDemand stations across the United States.

To date there have been no reviews collected by Rotten Tomatoes.

References

External links
 

2015 films
2015 computer-animated films
2015 horror films
2015 independent films
American animated horror films
American computer-animated films
American independent films
Films set in New York City
Films set in apartment buildings
2010s English-language films
2010s American films